Natalie "the Floacist" Stewart (born 13 February 1979) is an English rapper, singer, songwriter, spoken word artist, poet, and actress. Born in Germany and raised in London, she performed in various singing and dancing competitions as a child, and rose to fame in the early 2000s as part of the  R&B girl-duo Floetry. During a break, Stewart's first album, Floetic Soul (2010), was released which established her as a solo artist, with the singles "Forever" and "Let Me".

Her second solo album, Floetry Re:Birth (2012), contained singles "Say Yes", "Soul" and "Speechless". In 2014, she released a third solo album, Rise of the Phoenix Mermaid.

A self-described "modern-day poet", the Floacist creates songs that are often characterized by themes of love, relationships,and inspiration, as well as problems and solutions. In a career spanning 16 years, she has sold over 2 million records.

Early life
Stewart is the daughter of Jamaican immigrants. With her father in the British Armed Forces, she was born in Germany, the youngest of three children, and started school in Hong Kong. After her father left the army, the family settled in London. She attended the BRIT School for Performing Arts and Technology, where Marsha Ambrosius was studying business and finance. Stewart studied performing arts, media and art. She attended Middlesex University, and later transferred to the University of North London. She was a founding member of the performance poetry group 3 Plus 1, which was critically well received in London, Birmingham and Manchester. Stewart found her true calling on the performance poetry scene, where she was able to naturally merge all of her artistic expressional outputs as a writer and performer. This led to the manifestation of her Floetic ethos of "poetic delivery of musical intent".

Career

1999–2006: Floetry

Floetry was formed after Ambrosius joined her on stage in 1999 to perform at a spoken word night called Poets vs MC's, where they debuted a piece that they had written together called "Fantasize", combining spoken word and singing. In 2000, they went to the United States to perform on the poetry circuit. After frequenting spoken word/poetry spots in Atlanta, such as Yin Yang Poets' Cafe, they went to Philadelphia where they met Darren "Limitless" Henson and Keith "Keshon" Pelzer of DJ Jazzy Jeff's Touch of Jazz studio and began recording.

In 2002, they signed with DreamWorks Records and released their first album, Floetic, which included the singles "Floetic", "Say Yes" and "Getting Late". The album was released in the UK with additional tracks, one of which featured the British singer-songwriter and record producer, Sebastian Rogers. Due to the success of Floetry's live show, Floacism, a live album/DVD was released in November 2003
 
In 2005, Floetry released a second studio album, Flo'Ology. It debuted at number seven on the US Billboard 200 and included the single "SupaStar" featuring the rapper Common.

2006–2013: solo career
In 2006, the duo split up and Stewart returned to London but still moved back and forth between the UK and the US. During the next four years, she focused on her craft and continued to explore her Floetic ethos of poetic delivery with musical intent.

In mid-2010, she released the EP Spoken Soul. In November 2010, she released her first solo album, Floetic Soul on Shanachie Records. The album charted at number 95 on the Billboard Top 200 Albums chart and number 20 on the Top R&B Albums chart. The album included the singles "Forever", "Let Me" and "Keep It Going".

In 2011, the Floacist began recording her second album. In August 2012, she released a new version of the Floetry hit "Say Yes". In November 2012, she released her second album, The Floacist presents Floetry Re:Birth, and said that its title and theme represent a celebration of the tenth anniversary of Floetry's breakthrough as a recording act.

2014–2016: Rise of the Phoenix Mermaid and Floetry reunion

In March 2014, she released her third solo album, Rise of the Phoenix Mermaid. The album included the singles "Feel Good" and "On It". In December 2014, she reunited with Ambrosius during Ambrosius' concert and performed "Floetic" at The Clapham Grand in London. In February 2015, Stewart confirmed that they would be touring in 2015. On 16 May 2015, Floetry reunited and performed the first show in nine years at Pepsi Funk Festival in College Park in Georgia, USA. They continued to tour throughout 2015 and eventually announced plans to record a new albumbut split up after the second leg of the tour in August 2016.

2017–present: Good Life
In August 2017, Stewart (under the stage name "FLO") released a single titled "Good Life". In November 2017, she headlined her first solo tour called the "Let It FLO Tour". In 2019, she and her husband, Robbie Maddix, formed a musical duo called i'N'i.

Business and ventures

FLO Spoken Word Vortex
On 24 November 2014, Stewart hosted the first FLO Spoken Word Vortex. The event gives spoken word artists and poetics a platform to perform at Hideaway Jazz & Comedy Club in Streatham, London. The FLO Spoken Word Vortex event occurs on the first and third Thursday of every month. In September 2019, the FLO Spoken Word Vortex was performed at Warmdaddy's in Philadelphia, Pennsylvania, USA.

Personal life
The Floacist is known to speak of the ultimate focus of her life being the continual development, evolution and growth of her person; spiritually, mentally and artistically. When asked about her spiritual practices she simply responds that her spiritual practice is memory; remembering the peace before the confusion!

In 2017, Stewart married the former Stone Roses drummer Robbie Maddix. She currently resides on the southern coast of England.

Discography

Albums

EPs

Singles

Tours
 2003: Floetry Experience (with Marsha Ambrosius)
 2014-15: Floetry Reunion Tour (with Marsha Ambrosius)
 2017: Let It FLO Tour
 2019: FLO Spoken Word Vortex Tour

Filmography
 2004: One on One (as herself)
 2008: Reasonable Excuse (as Laila)
 2010: Remaindered (as the Background Performer)
 2010: The Creepy Doll (as the Waiting Room Patient #2)
 2012: Spirit Stalkers (as the Restaurant Patron)

References

External links
 
 
 

1979 births
Living people
Black British women rappers
21st-century Black British women singers
British contemporary R&B singers
English soul musicians
Musicians from London
Neo soul singers
People educated at the BRIT School
Black British actresses
Shanachie Records artists